

The Battle of St. Kitts or St. Cristopher was a successful Spanish expedition that seized the islands of Saint Kitts and Nevis from the English and French during the Anglo-Spanish War (1625–30).

Background
By the year 1629, the colony had grown sufficiently to be regarded as a threat to the Spanish West Indies. English settlers had been recruited to the number of nearly 3,000, and guns and ammunition had been sent over. Orders were given to the commander of the outward bound Spanish fleet Armada de Sotavento to Mexico to clear out the heavily armed English and French colonies.

Raid
The Spanish expedition, under the command of Admiral Fadrique Álvarez de Toledo Osorio, dropped anchor at Nevis Island and captured and destroyed several English ships anchored there. Spanish soldiers were then sent ashore to destroy the few newly built structures and capture the settlers.

When Nevis was seized by the Spanish forces, the island's plantation owners were deserted by their indentured servants, who swam out to the Spanish ships to cries of "Liberty, joyful Liberty". Many of the indentured servants on the island were Irish Roman Catholics and as such preferred to join forces with the Catholic Spanish than remain with the Protestant plantation owners.

On 7 September 1629, the Spanish expedition moved on to the sister island Saint Kitts and burned the entire settlement.

Aftermath
By the terms of surrender, the Spanish allotted shipping to carry some 700 of the colonists back to England. But other colonists, variously estimated at 200 to 400, evaded capture by taking to the hills and woods.
After an agreement between the Spanish and English crowns, the Spanish departed in 1630, handing the island to England. The fugitives returned to their plantations to form the nucleus of a new phase of colonization.

References
Robert L. Brenner, Merchants and Revolution: Commercial Change, Political Conflict, and London's Overseas Traders, 1550-1653, Verso (2003) 
John H. Elliot, Empires of the Atlantic World: Britain and Spain in America 1492-1830 Yale University Press (2007) 
Robert F. Marx, Shipwrecks in the Americas, New York (1971) 
Robert L. Paquette and Stanley L. Engerman, The Lesser Antilles In The Age Of European Expansion (1996) 
Robert L. Paquette, The Lesser Antilles in the Age of European Expansion, University Press of Florida (1996) 
Richard B. Sheridan, Sugar and Slavery; An Economic History Of The British West Indies, 1623-1775 The Johns Hopkins University Press (1 April 1974) 
Timothy R. Walton, The Spanish Treasure Fleets by Pineapple Press (1994) 
David Marley, Wars of the Americas: a chronology of armed conflict in the New World, 1492 to the present, ABC-CLIO (1998)

Footnotes

Conflicts in 1629
Battle Saint Kitts 1629
Battle Saint Kitts 1629
Battle of St. Kitts
Battle Saint Kitts 1629
Battle Saint Kitts
Battle Saint Kitts
Battle Saint Kitts
Battle Saint Kitts
Battles involving Spain
Battles involving England
Anglo-Spanish War (1625–1630)
Amphibious operations involving Spain